Sir Edmund Comyn of Kilbride (died 1314) was a 13th- and 14th-century Scottish noble. He was a younger son of William Comyn of Kilbride and Euphemia de Clavering.

Life
He succeeded to his brother John's estates after John died without an heir. He fought with his cousins the Earl of Buchan and the Lord of Badenoch at the Battle of Dunbar on 27 April 1296, where he was captured and became a prisoner of King Edward I of England until 1297 at Nottingham Castle. He was released from captivity and fought during Edward I's campaign in Flanders in 1297–98. He led a Scottish army with Simon Fraser crossing into England on 18 June 1303 to lay waste the countryside around Carlisle. He was forfeited of his lands in Fakenham Apes, Suffolk, England; however, he regained them after his submission to Edward I. He was stripped of his Scottish estates and titles by King Robert I of Scotland in 1306. Edmund died fighting on the English side during the Battle of Bannockburn on 23–24 June 1314.

Family and issue
Edmund married Maria, and had the following known issue:
Euphemia, married William de la Beche; had issue.
Mary

Citations

References
Watson, Fiona:	Under the Hammer: Edward I and Scotland, 1286-1307, Birlinn, 2013. , 9781907909191

External links
Edmund Comyn of Kilbride, knight @ People of Medieval Scotland, 1093–1314

1314 deaths
Clan Comyn
13th-century Scottish people
14th-century Scottish people
Scottish people of the Wars of Scottish Independence